Salem Ali Salem Al-Hajri (born 10 April 1996) is a Qatari footballer. He currently plays for Al-Sadd.

Al-Hajri is a member of the Qatar national team and was named in the nation's 2019 Copa America squad.

Club 
Al-Sadd
Qatar Cup: 2021

External links

References

Qatari footballers
Qatari expatriate footballers
1996 births
Living people
Al Sadd SC players
K.A.S. Eupen players
Aspire Academy (Qatar) players
Qatar Stars League players
2019 AFC Asian Cup players
Association football defenders
Association football midfielders
AFC Asian Cup-winning players
2019 Copa América players
Expatriate footballers in Belgium
Qatari expatriate sportspeople in Belgium
Qatar international footballers
Qatar youth international footballers
Qatar under-20 international footballers
2022 FIFA World Cup players